Association Sportive Stade Mandji is a Gabonese football club founded in 1962 and based in Port-Gentil, Ogooué-Maritime province. They play at Stade Pierre Claver Divounguy.

Achievements
Gabon Championnat National D1: 2
 2009, 2022.

Coupe du Gabon Interclubs: 2
 1978, 1979.

Super Coupe du Gabon: 0

Performance in CAF competitions
CAF Champions League: 1 appearance
2010 – Preliminary Round

Current squad

External links
About the club (in French)
Les-Pantheres.com (in French)

Stade Mandji
1962 establishments in Gabon
Association football clubs established in 1962